The Cruiserweight Classic, formerly the Global Cruiserweight Series, was a professional wrestling tournament and WWE Network event produced by WWE. All participants were billed at a weight of 205 lbs or less to determine the inaugural WWE Cruiserweight Champion for WWE's revived cruiserweight division. The tournament consisted of various matches that had predetermined results. Tournament qualifying matches took place in various promotions of the independent circuit, including well known promotions such as Revolution Pro Wrestling, Progress Wrestling, and Evolve. Many cruiserweight wrestlers from around the world were given the chance to qualify for the 32-man tournament, which took place over four dates: June 23, July 13, August 26, and September 14, 2016. The winner was T. J. Perkins.

Background
In 2016, WWE announced that they would be holding a 32-man professional wrestling tournament and WWE Network event wherein all participants were billed at a weight of 205 lbs or less, referred to as cruiserweights. The event was originally titled the Global Cruiserweight Series before being renamed as the Cruiserweight Classic. Tournament qualifying matches took place in various promotions of the independent circuit, including well known promotions such as Revolution Pro Wrestling, Progress Wrestling, and Evolve. Many cruiserweight wrestlers from around the world were given the chance to qualify for the 32-man single-elimination tournament, which took place over four dates: June 23, July 13, August 26, and September 14. During the finale, it was announced that the winner of the tournament would become the inaugural WWE Cruiserweight Champion for WWE's revived cruiserweight division, which would compete on the Raw brand. The tournament consisted of various matches that had predetermined results.

Announced competitors 
NXT competitors Rich Swann, Tommaso Ciampa, and Johnny Gargano along with international standouts Zack Sabre Jr., Noam Dar, Ho Ho Lun, and Akira Tozawa were announced for the Cruiserweight Classic. At an independent show in Orlando, Florida on April 2, Lince Dorado joined the series. On April 24 at Progress Wrestling Chapter 29, Sabre Jr., Jack Gallagher also won a qualifying match, while on May 7 at Evolve 61, T. J. Perkins and Drew Gulak also joined the series. On June 11 at Evolve 63, Tony Nese defeated Johnny Gargano, Drew Gulak, T. J. Perkins and Lince Dorado and qualified for the tournament. Two days later, WWE officially revealed all 32 wrestlers taking part in the tournament. Originally, Brazilian wrestler Zumbi was scheduled to compete in the Cruiserweight Classic. However, he had issues with his visa that WWE could not clear in time, and was replaced by Mustafa Ali.

Qualifying matches 
 Progress Wrestling Chapter 29 - April 24 (Electric Ballroom - Camden Town, London)

 Revolution Pro Wrestling Live at the Cockpit 8 - May 1 (Cockpit Theatre - Marylebone, London) 

 Evolve 61 - May 7 (La Boom - Woodside, Queens, New York)

 American Combat Wrestling The Tradition Continues! - May 28 (All Sports Arena - New Port Richey, Florida)

 Evolve 63 - June 11 (Downtown Recreation Complex - Orlando, Florida)

Participants

Alternates
In the event an official participant had suffered an injury or did not make the 205 lbs weight limit, they would have been replaced by one of the following participants:

Replaced
These participants were taken out of the tournament for a specific reason and therefore were replaced by another competitor.

Broadcast team

Results

Tournament bracket 

The following time limits were in place:
 Round one: 20 minutes
 Round two: 20 minutes
 Quarterfinals: 30 minutes
 Semifinals: 30 minutes
 Final: Unlimited

Finale

Aftermath
Before the final match between T. J. Perkins and Gran Metalik started, Triple H revealed that the winner of the tournament would be crowned the first WWE Cruiserweight Champion. Also, T. J. Perkins, Gran Metalik, Akira Tozawa, Jack Gallagher, Brian Kendrick, Cedric Alexander, Noam Dar, Lince Dorado, Tony Nese, Mustafa Ali, Drew Gulak, Tajiri,  Ariya Daivari, Rich Swann and The Bollywood Boyz signed contracts with WWE. On July 15, Pro Wrestling Torch reported that Kota Ibushi had signed an NXT contract with WWE. In an interview published July 25, Ibushi admitted he had been offered a contract, but denied having signed it. After the tournament, Pro Wrestling Torch went back on their earlier report and stated that Ibushi had not agreed to a WWE contract beyond the tournament, which was a factor in him losing the semifinal match.

See also 
 WWE 205 Live
 Mae Young Classic
 WWE United Kingdom Championship Tournament

Note

References

External links 
 
 
 
 

2016 WWE Network events
2016 in professional wrestling in Florida
WWE tournaments
Events in Florida
Professional wrestling in Winter Park, Florida
WWE 205 Live